The Sturgeon Bay Ship Canal is a ship canal connecting Sturgeon Bay with Lake Michigan across the Door Peninsula in Door County, Wisconsin. A dredged channel continues through Sturgeon Bay to Green Bay. This combined waterway allows ships to sail between Lake Michigan and Green Bay without traversing the dangerous Porte des Morts strait.

There are no locks.

History

The Sturgeon Bay Ship Canal was dug by a private group headed by then-president of Chicago and North Western Railway, William B. Ogden, between July 8, 1872 and the late fall of 1881. Although smaller craft began using the canal in 1880, it was not open for large-scale watercraft until 1890. Timber along the canal route was burned to get rid of it instead of being used for wood.

The cost of completing the  cut in 1881 was $291,461.69.

In 1893, the Ogden private investors group sold all interest in the canal to the United States government. Since that time, the canal has been maintained by the U.S. Army Corps of Engineers.

Description

Two jetties frame the canal's southeast entrance, each extending about  into Lake Michigan.

Gallery

Notes

External links
Sturgeon Bay Canal North Pierhead Light page
Sturgeon Bay Canal Light page
AmericanCanals.org info
Photo of the workers' quarters and the cleared route for the canal in Images of America: Sturgeon Bay by Ann Jinkins and Maggie Weir, Chicago: Arcadia Publishing, 2006, page 22

Ship canals
Canals in Wisconsin
Sturgeon Bay Ship Canal
Sturgeon Bay Ship Canal
Canals opened in 1881
1881 establishments in Wisconsin